Haswell is the codename for a processor microarchitecture developed by Intel as the "fourth-generation core" successor to the Ivy Bridge (which is a die shrink/tick of the Sandy Bridge microarchitecture).  Intel officially announced CPUs based on this microarchitecture on June 4, 2013, at Computex Taipei 2013, while a working Haswell chip was demonstrated at the 2011 Intel Developer Forum.  With Haswell, which uses a 22 nm process, Intel also introduced low-power processors designed for convertible or "hybrid" ultrabooks, designated by the "U" suffix.

Haswell CPUs are used in conjunction with the Intel 8 Series chipsets, Intel 9 Series chipsets, and Intel C220 series chipsets.

At least one Haswell-based processor is still being sold as of 2022, the Pentium G3420.

Design
The Haswell architecture is specifically designed to optimize the power savings and performance benefits from the move to FinFET (non-planar, "3D") transistors on the improved 22 nm process node.

Haswell has been launched in three major forms:
 Desktop version (LGA 1150 socket and the LGA 2011-v3 socket): Haswell-DT
 Mobile/Laptop version (PGA socket): Haswell-MB
 BGA version:
 47 W and 57 W TDP classes: Haswell-H (for "All-in-one" systems, Mini-ITX form factor motherboards, and other small footprint formats)
 13.5 W and 15 W TDP classes (MCP): Haswell-ULT (for Intel's UltraBook platform)
 10 W TDP class (SoC): Haswell-ULX (for tablets and certain UltraBook-class implementations)

Notes
 ULT = Ultra Low TDP; ULX = Ultra Low eXtreme TDP
 Only certain quad-core variants and BGA R-series stock keeping units (SKUs) receive GT3e (Intel Iris Pro 5200) integrated graphics.  All other models have GT3 (Intel HD 5000 or Intel Iris 5100), GT2 (Intel HD 4200, 4400, 4600, P4600 or P4700) or GT1 (Intel HD Graphics) integrated graphics. See also Intel HD and Iris Graphics for more details.
 Due to the low power requirements of tablet and UltraBook platforms, Haswell-ULT and Haswell-ULX are only available in dual-core configurations.  All other versions come as dual- or quad-core variants.

Performance
Compared to Ivy Bridge:
 Approximately 8% faster vector processing
 Up to 5% higher single-threaded performance
 6% higher multi-threaded performance
 Desktop variants of Haswell draw between 8% and 23% more power under load than Ivy Bridge.
 A 6% increase in sequential CPU performance (eight execution ports per core versus six)
 Up to 20% performance increase over the integrated HD4000 GPU (Haswell HD4600 vs Ivy Bridge's built-in Intel HD4000)
 Total performance improvement on average is about 3%
 Around 15 °C hotter than Ivy Bridge, while clock frequencies of over 4.6 GHz are achievable

Technology

Features carried over from Ivy Bridge
 22 nm manufacturing process
 3D Tri-Gate FinFET transistors
 Micro-operation cache (Uop Cache) capable of storing 1.5 K micro-operations (approximately 6 KB in size)
 14- to 19-stage instruction pipeline, depending on the micro-operation cache hit or miss (an approach used in the even earlier Sandy Bridge microarchitecture)
Improve OoO window from 168 to 192
Queue Allocation from 28/threads to 56
 Mainstream variants are up to quad-core.
 Native support for dual-channel DDR3/DDR3L memory, with up to 32 GB of RAM on LGA 1150 variants
 64 KB (32 KB Instruction + 32 KB Data) L1 cache and 256 KB L2 cache per core
 A total of 16 PCI Express 3.0 lanes on LGA 1150 variants

New features

CPU 
 Wider core: fourth arithmetic logic unit (ALU), third address generation unit (AGU), second branch execution unit (BEU), deeper buffers, higher cache bandwidth, improved front-end and memory controller, higher load/store bandwidth.
 New instructions (HNI, includes Advanced Vector Extensions 2 (AVX2), gather, BMI1, BMI2, ABM and FMA3 support).
 The instruction decode queue, which holds instructions after they have been decoded, is no longer statically partitioned between the two threads that each core can service.
 Intel Transactional Synchronization Extensions (TSX) for the Haswell-EX variant. In August 2014 Intel announced that a bug exists in the TSX implementation on the current steppings of Haswell, Haswell-E, Haswell-EP and early Broadwell CPUs, which resulted in disabling the TSX feature on affected CPUs via a microcode update.
 Fully integrated voltage regulator (FIVR), thereby moving some of the components from motherboard onto the CPU.
 New advanced power-saving system; due to Haswell's new low-power C6 and C7 sleep states, not all power supply units (PSUs) are suitable for computers with Haswell CPUs.
 37, 47, 57 W thermal design power (TDP) mobile processors.
 35, 45, 65, 84, 88, 95 and 130–140 W (high-end, Haswell-E) TDP desktop processors.
 15 W or 11.5W TDP processors for the Ultrabook platform (multi-chip package like Westmere) leading to reduced heat, which results in thinner as well as lighter Ultrabooks, but the performance level is slightly lower than the 17 W version.

{| class="wikitable" style="text-align: center; min-width: 26em;"
|+ 
|-
! colspan=2 | Cache
! colspan=3 | Page size
|-
! Name || Level || 4 KB || 2 MB || 1 GB
|-
| DTLB || 1st || 64 || 32 || 4
|-
| ITLB || 1st || 128 || 8 / logical core || none
|-
| STLB
|| 2nd
| colspan=2 | 1024
|| none
|}

GPU 

 Hardware graphics support for Direct3D 11.1 and OpenGL 4.3. Intel 10.18.14.5180 driver is the last planned driver release on Windows 7/8.1.
 Four versions of the integrated GPU: GT1, GT2, GT3 and GT3e, where GT3 version has 40 execution units (EUs).  Haswell's predecessor, Ivy Bridge, has a maximum of 16 EUs.  GT3e version with 40 EUs and on-package 128 MB of embedded DRAM (eDRAM), called Crystalwell, is available only in mobile H-SKUs and desktop (BGA-only) R-SKUs.  Effectively, this eDRAM is a Level 4 cache; it is shared dynamically between the on-die GPU and CPU, and serving as a victim cache to the CPU's Level 3 cache.

I/O 

 New sockets and chipsets:
 LGA 1150 for desktops, and rPGA947 and BGA1364 for the mobile market.
 Z97 (performance) and H97 (mainstream) chipsets for the Haswell Refresh and Broadwell, in Q2 2014.
 LGA 2011-v3 with X99 chipset for the enthusiast-class desktop platform Haswell-E.
 DDR4 for enterprise/server segments and for the Enthusiast-Class Desktop Platform Haswell-E
 Variable Base clock (BClk) like LGA 2011.
 Optional support for Thunderbolt technology and Thunderbolt 2.0
 Shrink of the Platform Controller Hub (PCH), from 65 nm to 32 nm.

Server processors features
 Haswell-EP variant, released in September 2014, with up to 18 cores and marketed as the Xeon E5-1600 v3 and Xeon E5-2600 v3 series.
 Haswell-EX variant, released in May 2015, with 18 cores and functioning TSX.
 A new cache design.
 Up to 35 MB total unified cache (last level cache, LLC) for Haswell-EP and up to 40 MB for Haswell-EX.
 LGA 2011-v3 socket replaces LGA 2011 for the Haswell EP; the new socket has the same number of pins, but it is keyed differently due to electrical incompatibility.
 The already launched Xeon E3 v3 Haswells will get a refresh in spring 2014, together with a refreshed Intel C220 series PCH chipset.
 TDP up to 160 W for Haswell-EP.
 Haswell-EP models with ten and more cores support cluster on die (COD) operation mode, allowing CPU's multiple columns of cores and last level cache (LLC) slices to be logically divided into what is presented as two non-uniform memory access (NUMA) CPUs to the operating system.  By keeping data and instructions local to the "partition" of CPU which is processing them, therefore decreasing the LLC access latency, COD brings performance improvements to NUMA-aware operating systems and applications.

Haswell Refresh
Around the middle of 2014, Intel released a refresh of Haswell, simply titled Haswell Refresh.   When compared to the original Haswell CPUs lineup, Haswell Refresh CPUs offer a modest increase in clock frequencies, usually  of 100 MHz.  Haswell Refresh CPUs are supported by Intel's 9 Series chipsets (Z97 and H97, codenamed Wildcat Point), while motherboards with 8 Series chipsets (codenamed Lynx Point) usually require a BIOS update to support Haswell Refresh CPUs.

The CPUs codenamed Devil's Canyon, covering the i5 and i7 K-series SKUs, employ a new and improved thermal interface material (TIM) called next-generation polymer thermal interface material (NGPTIM).  This improved TIM reduces the CPU's operating temperatures and improves the overclocking potential, as something that had been problematic since the introduction of Ivy Bridge. Other changes for the Devil's Canyon CPUs include a TDP increase to 88 W, additional decoupling capacitors to help smooth out the outputs from the fully integrated voltage regulator (FIVR), and support for the VT-d that was previously limited to non-K-series SKUs. TSX was another feature brought over from the non-K-series SKUs, until August 2014 when a microcode update disabled TSX due to a bug that was discovered in its implementation.

Windows XP and Vista support
While Ivy Bridge is the last Intel processor to fully support all versions of Windows XP, Haswell includes limited driver support for certain XP editions such as POSReady2009. People have modified the graphics driver for these versions to adapt to normal Windows XP to varying degrees of success.

Windows Vista support is also dropped with this processor as well. People who have installed x64 version of Vista have reported various problems such as services not starting automatically. The KB4493471 update (officially intended only for Windows Server 2008, but can be installed on Vista) contains a HAL driver that fixes most of these issues. Windows XP and earlier and x86 version of Vista is unaffected by this bug.

List of Haswell processors

Desktop processors

 All models support: MMX, SSE, SSE2, SSE3, SSSE3, SSE4.1, SSE4.2, F16C, Enhanced Intel SpeedStep Technology (EIST), Intel 64, XD bit (an NX bit implementation), Intel VT-x, and Smart Cache.
 Core i3, i5 and i7 support AVX, AVX2, BMI1, BMI2, FMA3, and AES-NI.
 Core i3 and i7, as well as the Core i5-4570T and i5-4570TE, support Hyper-Threading (HT).
 Core i5 and i7 support Turbo Boost 2.0.
 Although it was initially supported on selected models, since August 2014 desktop variants no longer support TSX due to a bug that was discovered in its implementation; as a workaround, a microcode update disabled the TSX feature.
 SKUs below 45xx as well as R-series and K-series SKUs do not support Trusted Execution Technology or vPro.
 Intel VT-d, which is Intel's IOMMU, is supported on all i5 and i7 SKUs except the i5-4670K and i7-4770K.  Support for VT-d requires the chipset and motherboard to also support VT-d.
 Models i5-4690K and i7-4790K, codenamed Devil's Canyon, have a better internal thermal grease to help heat escape and an improved internal voltage regulator ("FIVR"), to help deliver cleaner power in situations like overclocking.
 Transistors: 1.4 billion
 Die size: 177 mm2
 Intel HD and Iris Graphics in following variants:
 R-series desktop processors feature Intel Iris Pro 5200 graphics (GT3e).
 All other currently known i3, i5 and i7 desktop processors include Intel HD 4600 graphics (GT2).
 The exceptions are processors 41xxx, which include HD 4400 graphics (GT2).
 Celeron and Pentium processors contain Intel HD Graphics (GT1).
 Pentium G3258, also known as the Pentium Anniversary Edition, has an unlocked multiplier. Its release marks 20 years of "Pentium" as a brand.

The following table lists available desktop processors.

 Some of these configurations could be disabled by the chipset. For example, H-series chipsets disable all PCIe 3.0 lane configurations except 1×16.
 This feature also requires a chipset that supports VT-d like the Q87 chipset or the X99 chipset.
 This is called 20th Anniversary Edition and has an unlocked multiplier.
SKU suffixes to denote:
 K unlocked (adjustable CPU multiplier up to 63x)
The Pentium G3258 CPU is unlocked despite not having the K-suffix.
 S performance-optimized lifestyle (low power with 65 W TDP)
 T power-optimized lifestyle (ultra low power with 35–45 W TDP)
 R BGA packaging / High-performance GPU (currently Iris Pro 5200 (GT3e))
 X extreme edition (adjustable CPU ratio with no ratio limit)

Server processors

 All models support: MMX, SSE, SSE2, SSE3, SSSE3, SSE4.1, SSE4.2, AVX (Advanced Vector Extensions), AVX2, FMA3, F16C, BMI (Bit Manipulation Instructions 1)+BMI2, Enhanced Intel SpeedStep Technology (EIST), Intel 64, XD bit (an NX bit implementation), TXT, Intel vPro, Intel VT-x, Intel VT-d, hyper-threading (except E3-1220 v3 and E3-1225 v3), Turbo Boost 2.0, AES-NI, and Smart Cache.
 Haswell-EX models (E7-48xx/88xx v3) support TSX, while for Haswell-E, Haswell-WS (E3-12xx v3) and Haswell-EP (E5-16xx/26xx v3) models it was disabled via a microcode update in August 2014, due to a bug that was discovered in the TSX implementation.
 Transistors: 5.56 billion
 Die size: 661 mm2

The first digit of the model number designates the largest supported multi-socket configuration; thus, E5-26xx v3 models support up to dual-socket configurations, while the E7-48xx v3 and E7-88xx v3 models support up to quad- and eight-socket configurations, respectively.  Also, E5-16xx/26xx v3 and E7-48xx/88xx v3 models have no integrated GPU.

Lists of launched server processors are below, split between Haswell E3-12xx v3, E5-16xx/26xx v3 and E7-48xx/88xx v3 models.

{| class="wikitable sortable"
|+ Haswell E5-16xx/26xx v3 SKUs
|-
! rowspan="2" | Targetsegment
! rowspan="2" | Cores(threads)
! colspan="2" rowspan="2" | Processorbranding and model
! colspan="2" | CPU clock rate
! colspan="2" | CPU<br/ >AVX clock rate
! rowspan="2" data-sort-type="number" | L3cache
! rowspan="2" data-sort-type="number" | TDP
! rowspan="2" class="unsortable" | Releasedate
! rowspan="2" | Releaseprice(USD)tray / box
! colspan="3" | Motherboard
|-
! Normal
! data-sort-type="number" | Turbo
! Normal
! data-sort-type="number" | Turbo
! Socket
! Interface
! Memory
|-
| rowspan="28" | Server
| 18 (36)
| rowspan="36" | Xeon E5 v3
| 2699v3
| rowspan="2" | 2.3 GHz
| rowspan="2" | 3.6 GHz
| rowspan="2" | 1.9 GHz
| rowspan="2" | 3.3 GHz
| 45 MB
| 145 W
| rowspan="2" | 
| rowspan="2" 
| rowspan="36" | LGA2011-3
| rowspan="29" | QPI (up to9.6 GT/s)DMI 2.0PCIe 3.0
| rowspan="17" | up to DDR4-2133
|-
| rowspan="2" | 16 (32)
| 2698v3
| rowspan="2" |40 MB
| 135 W
|-
| 2698Av3
| 2.8 GHz
| 3.2 GHz
| 2.3 GHz
| 2.9 GHz
| 165 W
| November 2014
| OEM
|-
| rowspan="2" | 14 (28)
| 2697v3
| 2.6 GHz
| 3.6 GHz
| 2.2 GHz
| 3.3 GHz
| rowspan="2" | 35 MB
| 145 W
| rowspan="33" | 
| $2,702 / $2,706
|-
| 2695v3
| 2.3 GHz
| 3.3 GHz
| 1.9 GHz
| 3.0 GHz
| 120 W
| $2,424 / $2,428
|-
| 12 (24)
| 2690v3
| 2.6 GHz
| 3.5 GHz
| 2.3 GHz
| 3.2 GHz
| 30 MB
| 135 W
| $2,090 / $2,094
|-
| 14 (28)
| 2683v3
| 2.0 GHz
| 3.0 GHz
| 1.7 GHz
| 2.7 GHz
| 35 MB
| rowspan="2" | 120 W
| $1,846 / —
|-
| rowspan="3" | 12 (24)
| 2680v3
| 2.5 GHz
| 3.3 GHz
| 2.1 GHz
| 3.1 GHz
| rowspan="3" | 30 MB
| $1,745 / $1,749
|-
| '2673v3
| 2.4 GHz
| 3.1 GHz
| 
| 
| 105 W
| 
|-
| 2670v3
| 2.3 GHz
| 3.1 GHz
| 2.0 GHz
| 2.9 GHz
| 120 W
| $1,589 / $1,593
|-
| 8 (16)
| 2667v3
| 3.2 GHz
| 3.6 GHz
| 2.7 GHz
| 3.5 GHz
| 20 MB
| 135 W
| $2,057 / —
|-
| 10 (20)
| 2660v3
| 2.6 GHz
| 3.3 GHz
| 2.2 GHz
| 3.1 GHz
| 25 MB
| 105 W
| $1,445 / $1,449
|-
| rowspan="2" | 12 (24)
| 2650Lv3
| 1.8 GHz
| 2.5 GHz
| 1.5 GHz
| 2.3 GHz
| rowspan="2" | 30 MB
| 65 W
| $1,329 / —
|-
| 2658v3
| 2.2 GHz
| 2.9 GHz
| 1.9 GHz
| 3.0 GHz
| rowspan="2" | 105 W
| $1,832 / —
|-
| 10 (20)
| 2650v3
| 2.3 GHz
| 3.0 GHz
| 2.0 GHz
| 2.8 GHz
| 25 MB
| $1,166 / $1,171
|-
| 12 (24)
| 2648Lv3
| 1.8 GHz
| 2.5 GHz
| 1.5 GHz
| 2.2 GHz
| 30 MB
| 75 W
| $1,544 / —
|-
| 6 (12)
| 2643v3
| 3.4 GHz
| 3.7 GHz
| 2.8 GHz
| 3.6 GHz
| 20 MB
| 135 W
| $1,552 / —
|-
| 8 (16)
| 2640v3
| 2.6 GHz
| 3.4 GHz
| 2.2 GHz
| 3.4 GHz
| 20 MB
| 90 W
| $939 / $944
| up to DDR4-1866
|-
| 4 (8)
| 2637v3
| 3.5 GHz
| 3.7 GHz
| 3.2 GHz
| 3.6 GHz
| 15 MB
| 135 W
| $996 / —
| up to DDR4-2133
|-
| rowspan="2" | 8 (16)
| 2630v3
| 2.4 GHz
| 3.2 GHz
| 2.1 GHz
| 3.2 GHz
| rowspan="2" | 20 MB
| 85 W
| $667 / $671
| rowspan="6" | up to DDR4-1866
|-
| 2630Lv3
| 1.8 GHz
| 2.9 GHz
| 1.5 GHz
| 2.9 GHz
| 55 W
| $612 / —
|-
| 10 (20)
| 2628Lv3
| 2.0 GHz
| 2.5 GHz
| 1.7 GHz
| 2.4 GHz
| 25 MB
| 75 W
| $1,364 / —
|-
| 4 (8)
| 2623v3
| 3.0 GHz
| 3.5 GHz
| 2.7 GHz
| 3.5 GHz
| 10 MB
| 105 W
| $444 / —
|-
| 6 (12)
| 2620v3
| 2.4 GHz
| 3.2 GHz
| 2.1 GHz
| 3.2 GHz
| 15 MB
| 85 W
| $417 / $422
|-
| 8 (16)
| 2618Lv3
| 2.3 GHz
| 3.4 GHz
| 1.9 GHz
| 3.4 GHz
| 20 MB
| 75 W
| $779 / —
|-
| 6 (6)
| 2609v3
| 1.9 GHz
| rowspan="3" 
| 1.9 GHz
| rowspan="3" 
| rowspan="3" | 15 MB
| 85 W
| $306 / $306
| up to DDR4-1600
|-
| 6 (12)
| 2608Lv3
| 2.0 GHz
| 1.7 GHz
| 52 W
| $441 / —
| up to DDR4-1866
|-
| 6 (6)
| 2603v3
| 1.6 GHz
| 1.3 GHz
| 85 W
| $213 / $217
| up to DDR4-1600
|-
| rowspan="8" | Workstation
| 10 (20)
| 2687Wv3
| 3.1 GHz
| 3.5 GHz
| 2.7 GHz
| 3.5 GHz
| 25 MB
| 160 W
| $2,141 / $2,145
| rowspan="6" | up to DDR4-2133
|-
| rowspan="2" | 8 (16)
| 1680v3
| 3.2 GHz
| 3.8 GHz
| 2.9 GHz
| 3.4 GHz
| rowspan="2" | 20 MB
| rowspan="7" | 140 W
| $1,723 / —
| rowspan="7" | DMI 2.0PCIe 3.0
|-
| 1660v3
| 3.0 GHz
| 3.5 GHz
| 2.7 GHz
| 3.5 GHz
| $1,080 / —
|-
| 6 (12)
| 1650v3
| 3.5 GHz
| 3.8 GHz
| 3.2 GHz
| 3.7 GHz
| 15 MB
| $583 / $586
|-
| rowspan="2" | 4 (8)
| 1630v3
| 3.7 GHz
| 3.8 GHz
| 3.4 GHz
| 3.7 GHz
| rowspan="4" | 10 MB
| $372 / —
|-
| 1620v3
| 3.5 GHz
| 3.6 GHz
| 3.2 GHz
| 3.5 GHz
| $294 / $297
|-
| 4 (4)
| 1607v3
| 3.1 GHz
| rowspan="2" 
| 2.8 GHz
| rowspan="2" 
| $255 / —
| rowspan="2" |up to DDR4-1866
|-
| 4 (4)
| 1603v3
| 2.8 GHz
| 2.5 GHz
|$202 / —
|}

SKU suffixes to denote:
 L low power

Mobile processors
 All models support: MMX, SSE, SSE2, SSE3, SSSE3, SSE4.1, SSE4.2, F16C, Enhanced Intel SpeedStep Technology (EIST), Intel VT-x, Intel 64, XD bit (an NX bit implementation), and Smart Cache. Core i3, i5 and i7 support AVX, AVX2, BMI1, BMI2, FMA3, and hyper-threading (HT).
 Core i3, i5 and i7 except the Core i3-4000M support AES-NI.
 Core i5 and i7 except the Core i5-4410E, i5-4402EC, i7-4700EC, and i7-4702EC support Turbo Boost 2.0.''
 Platform Controller Hub (PCH) integrated into the CPU package, slightly reducing the amount of space used on motherboards.
 Transistors: 1.3 billion
 Die size: 181 mm2

The following table lists available mobile processors.

<li> When a cooler or quieter mode of operation is desired, this mode specifies a lower TDP and lower guaranteed frequency versus the nominal mode.
<li> This is the processor's rated frequency and TDP.
<li> When extra cooling is available, this mode specifies a higher TDP and higher guaranteed frequency versus the nominal mode.

SKU suffixes to denote:
 M mobile processor (Socket G3)
 Q quad-core
 U ultra-low power (BGA1168 packaging)
 X "extreme"
 Y extreme low-power (BGA1168 packaging)
 E / H BGA1364 packaging

See also
 LGA 1150: Original Haswell chipsets
 List of Intel chipsets
 List of Intel CPU microarchitectures

Notes

References

External links
 
 
 
 
 
 

Haswell microarchitecture
Intel microarchitectures
Transactional memory
X86 microarchitectures